Heisenberg's uncertainty principle is a fundamental concept in quantum physics.

Uncertainty principle may also refer to:

 Fourier uncertainty principle, a concept in mathematics akin to Heisenberg's uncertainty principle
 Küpfmüller's uncertainty principle, a concept in electronic engineering formulated by Karl Küpfmüller
 The Uncertainty Principle (film), a 2002 Portuguese drama
 The Uncertainty Principle (audio drama), a production based on the British television series Doctor Who
 "The Uncertainty Principle", a season 1 episode of the TV series Joan of Arcadia
 "Uncertainty Principle" (Numbers), a 2005 episode of the TV series Numbers
 "The Uncertainty Principle" (The Spectacular Spider-Man), a 2008 episode of the TV series The Spectacular Spider-Man
 "The Uncertainty Principle", a 2009 episode of the TV series Holby City
 The Uncertainty Principle, a 1978 novel by Dmitri Bilenkin
 Uncertainty Principle, a 2003 novel by Gregorio Morales
 Uncertainty Principle, a British drone/funeral doom metal one-man band

See also
 Uncertainty, a situation involving ambiguous or unknown information